Julius Wesley Becton Jr. (born June 29, 1926) is a retired United States Army lieutenant general, former director of the Federal Emergency Management Agency (FEMA), and education administrator. He served as Commanding General, VII Corps in 1978 and as Deputy Commanding General for Training of the United States Army Training and Doctrine Command (TRADOC) in 1981. He retired in 1983.

Early life and education
Becton was born in Bryn Mawr, Pennsylvania, on June 29, 1926. He joined the U.S. Army Air Corps in July 1944, graduated infantry Officer Candidate School in 1945, and served with 93rd Infantry Division. He separated from the Army in 1946, but returned to service after President Harry S. Truman's executive order to integrate the U.S. Armed Forces in 1948.

Career

Becton went on to serve in the Korean War and the Vietnam War, eventually rising to the rank of lieutenant general in 1978 and command of VII Corps in Europe during the Cold War. Among his decorations were the Distinguished Service Medal, two Silver Stars, two Legion of Merit medals, and two Purple Hearts, along with the Knight Commander's Cross of the Order of Merit of Germany.

While in the service, Becton graduated from Prairie View Agricultural and Mechanical University (Bachelor's Degree in Mathematics in 1960), the University of Maryland (Master's Degree in Economics in 1966). He also graduated from the U.S. Army Command and General Staff College, the Armed Forces Staff College, and the National War College.

Becton retired from the U.S. Army in 1983, after nearly 40 years of service. However, his public service career was far from over. From 1984 to 1985, he served as the Director of the Office of Foreign Disaster Assistance in the United States Agency for International Development (US AID). He then served as the Director of FEMA from 1985 to 1989 under President Ronald Reagan.

In his mid-60s, Becton began a new career as an education administrator. From 1989 to 1994, Becton was the fifth president of Prairie View A&M University (his alma mater). President Becton was the first graduate of Prairie View A&M University to attain flag rank in the military.

In 1996, he became the Superintendent of the Washington, D.C. public school system.

Becton now serves as a director to several corporations, academic institutions, and associations. His many honors include being named several times by Ebony magazine as "One of the 100 Most Influential Blacks in America," and he has also received the Distinguished Service Award Association of the U.S. Army and the Boy Scouts of America's Silver Beaver Award. His autobiography, Becton: Autobiography of a Soldier and Public Servant, was published in 2008 by Naval Institute Press.

Personal life
Becton resides at The Fairfax in Fort Belvoir, Virginia. Becton and his late wife, Louise, have five grown children, 10 grandchildren, and three great-grandchildren.

Decorations

References

 Interview at the Pritzker Military Museum & Library

External links

1926 births
African-American United States Army personnel
United States Army personnel of World War II
United States Army personnel of the Korean War
United States Army personnel of the Vietnam War
Federal Emergency Management Agency officials
Knights Commander of the Order of Merit of the Federal Republic of Germany
Living people
Prairie View A&M University alumni
Recipients of the Distinguished Flying Cross (United States)
Recipients of the Distinguished Service Medal (US Army)
Recipients of the Gallantry Cross (Vietnam)
Recipients of the Legion of Merit
Recipients of the Silver Star
United States Army Command and General Staff College alumni
United States Army generals
University of Maryland, College Park alumni
People from Fort Belvoir, Virginia
People from Bryn Mawr, Pennsylvania
Military personnel from Pennsylvania
Superintendents of District of Columbia Public Schools
United States Army Air Forces personnel of World War II
21st-century African-American people
African Americans in World War II
African Americans in the Korean War
African Americans in the Vietnam War